Hocken is a surname. Notable people with the surname include:

Elizabeth Hocken (1848-1933), artist and translator from New Zealand
Horatio Clarence Hocken (1857–1937), Canadian politician
Peter Hocken (born 1932), Roman Catholic priest
Sheila Hocken, English writer and canine specialist
Thomas Hocken (1836–1910), New Zealand collector, bibliographer and researcher

See also 

Hocken Collections